Piotr Brzózka (born 14 October 1989 in Wodzisław Śląski) is a Polish cross-country mountain biker. At the 2012 Summer Olympics, he competed in the Men's cross-country at Hadleigh Farm, finishing in 32nd place.

References

Polish male cyclists
Cross-country mountain bikers
Living people
Olympic cyclists of Poland
Cyclists at the 2012 Summer Olympics
1989 births
People from Rydułtowy
Sportspeople from Silesian Voivodeship